Gabriel Alejandro Báez Corrales (born 21 July 1995) is an Argentine professional footballer who plays as a left back for Cerro Largo.

In 2015, he made his professional debut with Newell's Old Boys at the age of 19. He was subsequently loaned out to Mexican club Venados in 2017.

References

External links
 
ascensomx.net

1995 births
Living people
Argentine footballers
Argentine expatriate footballers
Association football defenders
Newell's Old Boys footballers
Venados F.C. players
Cerro Largo F.C. players
Argentine Primera División players
Ascenso MX players
Uruguayan Primera División players
Footballers from Buenos Aires
Argentine expatriate sportspeople in Mexico
Argentine expatriate sportspeople in Uruguay
Expatriate footballers in Mexico
Expatriate footballers in Uruguay